Muhammadu Attahiru I (died 1903) was the twelfth Sultan of the Sokoto Caliphate from October 1902 until March 15, 1903.  He was the last independent Sultan of Sokoto before the Caliphate was taken over by the British.

Reign as Sultan
Attahiru  came to the throne upon the death of Abderrahman dan Abi Bakar in October 1902 while the British forces had already taken over parts of the Sokoto Caliphate.  During the last year of Abderrahman's reign, British General Frederick Lugard had been able to use rivalries between the emirs in the south with the Sokoto Caliphate to prevent a coherent defense against British troops. A British led force was quickly approaching the city of Sokoto with clear intentions to take it over.  Attahiru I organized a quick defense of the city and decided to fight the advancing British army outside of the city of Sokoto.  This battle ended quickly in favor of the British with superior firepower causing high casualties on the side of Attahiru I.

Attahiru I and many followers fled the city of Sokoto on what Attahiru I described as a hijra to prepare for the coming of the Mahdi.  The British moved into the largely depopulated Sokoto and appointed Muhammadu Attahiru II the new Caliph.  Lugard essentially abolished the Caliph and retained the title Sultan as a symbolic position in the newly organized Northern Nigeria Protectorate.

Attahiru I begun traveling through the rural regions of the Sokoto Caliphate pursued by the British gathering supporters for his movement.  The British and emirs working with the British were shocked at the large number of people who joined Attahiru and his force grew to thousands.  Marching through Zamfara and Kano, the British became increasingly concerned with the force.  The British attacked the rebels in the Mbormi Battle Ground, near present-day Gombe, in 1903 and Attahiru I was amongst those killed. The British then proceeded to decapitate Attahiru, took photographs of the beheaded sultan, and then displayed the photographs throughout Northern Nigeria to "convince the diehards of the futility of fighting".  His son, Muhammad Bello bin Attahiru or Mai Wurno continued to lead the remaining members of the movement and eventually settled in Sudan, where many of the descendants still live today.

See also
Tomb of Muhammadu Attahiru I

References

 

 

1903 deaths
Sultans of Sokoto
20th-century rulers in Africa
Year of birth missing
People from colonial Nigeria
19th-century births
19th-century Nigerian people
20th-century Nigerian people
African resistance to colonialism